The Serie A2 di pallanuoto maschile is the second division of the Italian water polo male national championship.

The tournament involved 24 teams, which are divided into two groups according to the geographical position of the teams, each consisting of twelve associations, the Northern group and the Southern group.

It's played a regular season with two stages at the end of which the top four teams of each group participating in play-off, tithes and eleventh to play-out and the latest recede directly to Serie B.

In play-off the teams intersect in two boards according to the following schedule:

References

Ita
Water polo competitions in Italy
Water